Saraswati Bajiyam is a Nepalese politician, belonging to the Nepali Congress Party, currently serving as the member of the 2nd Federal Parliament of Nepal. In the 2022 Nepalese general election she was elected as a proportional representative from Indigenous people category.

References

Living people
Nepal MPs 2022–present
21st-century Nepalese women politicians
Nepali Congress politicians
Year of birth missing (living people)